Chaetomidium is a genus of fungi within the Chaetomiaceae family. The genus name is synonymous with Aporothielavia (Malloch & Cain).

References

External links
Chaetomidium at Index Fungorum

Sordariales
Taxa named by Friedrich Wilhelm Zopf